Richard Rudolf Walzer, FBA (14 July 1900 in Berlin – 16 April 1975 in Oxford) was a German-born British scholar of Greek philosophy and of Arabic philosophy.

Education: Werner-Siemens-Realgymnasium, Berlin-Schöneberg; Frederick William University of Berlin.

Career
 Assistant (1927), Privatdocent in Classics (1932), Frederick William University of Berlin, 1927–1933
 Lecturer in Greek Philosophy, University of Rome, 1933–1938
 Lecturer in Mediaeval Philosophy (Arabic and Hebrew) (1942), Senior Lecturer in Arabic and Greek Philosophy (1950), Oriel College, Oxford, 1942–1962
 Honorary Professor, University of Hamburg, 1952
 Member, Institute for Advanced Study, Princeton University, 1953–1954
 Fellow, Reader in Arabic and Greek Philosophy St Catherine's College, Oxford, 1962–1970
 He was elected a Fellow of the British Academy in 1956.

References

Jewish philosophers
British philosophers
German philologists
British philologists
German orientalists
British orientalists
German scholars of ancient Greek philosophy
Fellows of the British Academy
Jewish emigrants from Nazi Germany to the United Kingdom
Writers from Berlin
1900 births
1975 deaths
German male non-fiction writers
Farabi scholars
20th-century German philosophers
20th-century philologists